Paravur may refer to:

 North Paravur, a municipality and town in Ernakulam district, Kerala, India
 South Paravur, a village in Ernakulam district, Kerala, India
 Paravur, Kollam, a municipality and town in Kerala, India
 Paravur, Alappuzha, a village in Alappuzha district, Kerala, India
 Paravur, Malappuram a village in Malappuram district, Kerala, India
 Paravur Lake, a lake in Paravur, Kollam, Kerala, India
 Paravur railway station, a major railway station in Kollam district, Kerala, India
 Paravur Taluk, in Ernakulam district, Kerala, India